Namhae may refer to:

Geography
 Namhae (sea), the region of ocean near Korea
 Namhae County, a county in South Korea
 Namhaedo or Namwee Island, an island in South Korea
 Namhae Bridge, which connects Namhaedo and the mainland
 Namhae Castle, Namhaedo

Other
 Namhae of Silla, the second king of Silla

See also
South Sea (disambiguation)
Nanhai (disambiguation), the Mandarin Chinese cognate of Namhae